High School U.S.A. is a 1983 American made-for-television comedy film starring Michael J. Fox, Nancy McKeon, Anthony Edwards, and Crispin Glover, directed by Rod Amateau. The film originally aired on NBC on October 16, 1983.

Several of the main actors appeared in sitcoms that were popular at that time. These include Todd Bridges and Dana Plato from Diff'rent Strokes, Nancy McKeon from The Facts of Life, and Michael J. Fox from Family Ties, as well as a number of former 1950s and 1960s sitcom stars, including Tony Dow, Frank Bank, and Ken Osmond from Leave It to Beaver.

Plot
The film focuses on the intrigue inside Excelsior Union High School. J.J. Manners, becomes enamored with Beth Franklin, the girlfriend of Beau Middleton, who somehow manages to be the class president despite alienating most of the school; he is also their football team's quarterback. Middleton is also the richest student, a spoiled young man who drives around in a Porsche 911 convertible.

The core story involves Manners and Middleton competing for the affections of Beth. Ultimately this rivalry culminates in a drag race between the two. The result of the race tips the balance and changes the dynamics within the school irrevocably. In the end, J.J. ends up winning Beth's affections.

Other storylines include a genius, Otto, who has created a robot that he believes to be capable of traveling into space (the robot also humiliates Beau Middleton at the end of the film by pulling down his trousers before the entire student body). Archie Feld is a socially impaired boy who stands out as nervous about interacting with the opposite sex, all while surrounded by friends who all struggle with the intricacies of intergender relationships. Also, Beau Middleton's father has created an incentive for the teachers by offering a sizable reward for the best teacher. Subsequently, the teachers focus extra effort on impressing Beau with their worthiness of the reward.

Cast
 Michael J. Fox – J.J. Manners
 Nancy McKeon – Beth Franklin
 Crispin Glover – Archie Feld
 Frank Bank – Mr. Gerardi
 Crystal Bernard – Anne-Marie Conklin
 Todd Bridges – Otto Lipton
Dana Plato – Cara Ames
 Jon Caliri – Jerry
 Angela Cartwright – Miss D'Angelo
 Kelly Ann Conn – Swoozie
 Bob Denver – Milton Feld
 Elinor Donahue – Mrs. Franklin
 Tony Dow – Principal Pete Kinney
 Anthony Edwards – Beau Middleton
 Steve Franken – Dr. Fritz Hauptmann
 Jonathan Gries – Dirty Curt
 Dwayne Hickman – Mr. Plaza
 Lauri Hendler – Nadine
 Barry Livingston – Mr. Sirota
 Jerry Maren – Robot
 David Nelson – Mr. Krinsky, janitor
 Ken Osmond – Baxter Franklin
 David Packer – Danny
 Cathy Silvers – Peggy
 Tom Villard – Crazy Leo Bandini
 Kaley Ward – Chris
 Dawn Wells – Miss Lorilee Lee
 Michael Zorek – Chuckie Dipple

Production

Casting
According to stand-up comedian and future Mystery Science Theater 3000 star Joel Hodgson, he was asked to be one of the stars of the proposed series.  Hodgson turned the offer down after telling the network he did not think the material was good.  The network raised their offer, thinking his refusal was a bargaining ploy.  Because of this experience, Hodgson decided Hollywood was too shallow to work with and quit the industry until 1987, when he created MST3K.

Fox and Glover would go on the following year to work together again in Back to the Future.

Filming
Fox met McKeon on set and the two of them dated for a while, and starred in another TV movie, Poison Ivy.

Pilot
A one-hour pilot was created due to the success of the original movie, but no longer featuring the star teen actors.  It was not picked up by the network, and was aired on May 26, 1984 (the Saturday evening of Memorial Day weekend).

Crystal Bernard, Crispin Glover, Jonathan Gries, Ken Osmond, and Michael Zorek were the only cast members to return for the pilot (with Osmond playing a teacher instead of a parent).

Barbara Billingsley and Jerry Mathers, the only two Leave It to Beaver cast members who weren't in the film, joined the pilot while Dow and Bank did not return. Similarly, David Nelson did not return while his mother and brother (and Ozzie and Harriet co-stars), Harriet Nelson and Ricky Nelson, joined the cast. Other classic TV stars to join included Dick York (from Bewitched), Burt Ward and Julie Newmar (both from Batman).

References

External links
  
 

1983 television films
1983 films
1980s teen comedy films
NBC network original films
American coming-of-age comedy films
American high school films
Films directed by Rod Amateau
American teen comedy films
Films scored by Miles Goodman
1980s English-language films
1980s American films